The Londonderry Air is a 1938 British romance film directed by Alex Bryce and starring Sara Allgood, Liam Gaffney and Phyllis Ryan. It was based on a play by Rachel Field.

Plot summary
A young woman abandons her plans to settle down in a respectable marriage and runs off with a travelling fiddler she falls in love with.

Cast
 Sara Allgood as Widow Rafferty 
 Liam Gaffney as The Pedlar 
 Phyllis Ryan as Rose Martha 
 Jimmy Mageean as Sheamus 
 Maureen Moore as Mrs. Murphy 
 Grenville Darling as Auctioneer 
 Kitty Kirwan as Deaf Woman

References

External links

1930s romance films
Films directed by Alex Bryce
British black-and-white films
British romance films
1930s English-language films
1930s British films
English-language romance films